Eliodoro Matte Ossa (11 April 1905 – 22 July 2000) was a Chilean businessman, founder of the Chilean forestry and paper company CMPC.

He is the son of Eliodoro Matte Gormaz and Rosario Ossa Lynch.

In 1942, he married María Larraín Vial, and they had three children, Eliodoro Matte, Bernardo Matte, and Patricia Matte

As of October 2015, Forbes stated that all his three children were billionaires.

References

1905 births
2000 deaths
Chilean billionaires
20th-century Chilean businesspeople
Chilean businesspeople in timber
Eliodoro
Chilean manufacturing businesspeople